"Conviction of the Heart" is a song by singer-songwriter Kenny Loggins from his 1991 album, Leap of Faith. The song written by Loggins and Guy Thomas, and produced by the former and Terry Nelson. It was released as the album's first single in 1991 by Columbia Records. A live version was also recorded on the album and video for his 1992 live, Outside: From the Redwoods.

Since its release, the song has become one of his signature tunes. The song was hailed as "unofficial anthem of the environmental movement" by Al Gore, when Loggins performed it on Earth Day in 1995 at The National Mall in Washington, D.C.

Credits and personnel
Steve Woods - Keyboards
Kenny Loggins - Acoustic guitar
Guy Thomas - Electric guitar
David Lindley - Electric slide guitar
Freddie Washington - Bass
Tris Imboden - Drums
Michael Baird - Field snare
Munyungo Jackson & Bill Summers - Caxixi, Shekere, Djn-Djun, Gunga-Degung, Bata, Djembe
Kate Price & Terry Nelson - Background vocals
Adult Choir - choir (with Arnold McCuller as choir director)
Colors of Love - children's choir (with Nyna Shannon Anderson as choir director)

Credits adapted from the album's liner notes.

Charts

Weekly charts

Year-end charts

References

1990s ballads
1991 songs
1991 singles
Pop ballads
Gospel songs
Kenny Loggins songs
Songs written by Kenny Loggins
Columbia Records singles